Liz Masakayan (born December 31, 1964 in Quezon City, Philippines) is a championship athlete in both indoor and beach volleyball.

Early life 
Liz Masakayan had not always played volleyball.  In fact it was the last organized sport she tried out for in her first year (10th grade) at Santa Monica High School (a three-year school back in the 1980s).  Her first year was spent on the junior varsity squad, and the last two on the varsity counterpart where the team won the California state championship in 1981.  When she was ten she played Little League baseball, the first year it allowed girls to play due to Title IX.  Most of the time she was the only girl on the team, but played 3 positions (pitcher, first base, and center field).  Masakayan heard a lot of comments over 4 years from playing on a team full of boys but says, "I learned at an early age that if you just worked hard, had fun, and treated people nicely, that everything would fall into place, like winning." She played AYSO soccer for six years and ran track four years.  Not choosing to run track anymore in 11th grade, Masakayan helped form the first (1981) girls' soccer team at Santa Monica High School and played mid back and goalie for 2 years.

College
While at UCLA, she won the Broderick Award (now the Honda Sports Award) as the nation's best female collegiate volleyball player in 1985.

Professional career 
Source:

As an indoor player, Masakayan was a member of the USA Volleyball team for 5 years and a starter in the 1988 Seoul, Korea Olympics. She won bronze medals at the 1990 World Championships in Beijing, China, 1987 Pan Am Games in Indianapolis, Indiana, and 1986 Goodwill Games in Moscow, Soviet Union. After winning the 1984 NCAA Championships at UCLA, where she still holds numerous single season and career records, Masakayan was given the Broderick Award for being the nation's premier collegiate volleyball player. Masakayan is a two-time 1st team All-American, three-time 1st team All-Conference and was selected two times to the NCAA All-Tournament Team. Masakayan was then named the 1985-86 UCLA Female Athlete of the Year, as well as to the 1980s UCLA All-Decade Team and the 1999 Volleyball Magazine's All-Millennium Team.  She has also been inducted into the UCLA Athletics Hall of Fame.

As an indoor coach, Masakayan was an assistant coach at UCLA when they won the National Championships in 1991 and runner up in 1992, a volunteer assistant when they placed 5th in 1993, and a student assistant when they placed 5th in 2003.  Masakayan was inducted in the AVCA (American Volleyball Coaches Association) Hall of Fame in December of 2011.

Throughout Masakayan's beach volleyball career she won 47 tournaments and has also been in the final four 61 times.  Although she participated in several AVP (Associated Volleyball Professionals) events in 2005, placing 3rd in the San Diego tournament, Masakayan officially retired from domestic competition after the 2003 season.  In 2001 she was the Santa Barbara champion and in December captured the bronze medal at the FIVB (Fédération Internationale de Volleyball) season finale in Fortaleza, Brazil, where Masakayan announced her retirement from international competition. She was awarded the Speedo Player of the Tournament.

She and her partner, Elaine Youngs, were 4th in the world in points toward qualifying for the 2000 Sydney Olympics in Australia, however, only two teams per country were accepted.  They captured the first tournament of the millennium in February 2000 at Vitoria, Brazil, as well as winning the Espinho, Portugal, and Dalian, China, events later on that season.  The pair also won the bronze medal at the 1999 World Championships in Marseille, France, ranking them 2nd in the world. Ranked No. 1 in the U.S. in 1999, they won 4 out of the 7 domestic events, and in 1997 they captured the Chicago Open and the Best of the Beach tournament in Kauai.

(Karolyn) Kirby/Masakayan are currently ranked third on the list for most professional wins as a team with 29. They won the 1993, 94 and 95 Shootouts and U.S. Opens, the 1993 and 94 U.S. Championships and the inaugural 1994 Goodwill Games in St. Petersburg, Russia.  1994 World Champions in La Serena, Chile, Kirby/Masakayan shared the World's Most Outstanding Player award that year. Masakyan was the WPVA's (Women's Professional Volleyball Association) 1992 Most Valuable Player, the 1993 co-Most Valuable Player and the Best Defensive Player in 1991 and 1992. In addition, she was the 1993 and 94 Best Hitter and the 1995 Most Inspirational Player after coming back from several knee surgeries.

Olympics 
As an indoor player, Masakayan was a member of the USA Volleyball Team for 5 years and a starter in the 1988 Seoul Olympics in South Korea. She won bronze medals at the 1990 World Championships in Beijing, China, 1987 Pan Am Games in Indianapolis, Indiana, and 1986 Goodwill Games in Moscow, Soviet Union.

She started coaching beach volleyball in 2004 with the team of Elaine Youngs and Holly McPeak. They ended the AVP season as the 2nd ranked team, and Holly was the voted the Best Defensive Player. Masakayan coached them at the 2004 Athens, Greece Olympics to win a bronze medal. She then worked with the team of Elaine Youngs and Rachel Wacholder, the 2005 2nd ranked AVP team who placed 5th at the FIVB World Championships. Wacholder was awarded the AVP's Most Improved Player and Best Defensive Player. From 2006-2008, Masakayan coached the 2nd ranked AVP team of Elaine Youngs and Nicole Branagh.  Branagh was voted the 2006 AVP Rookie of the Year, 2007 AVP Most Improved Player, and the 2008 AVP and FIVB Most Improved Player. Masakayan coached them to 5th place finishes at both the 2007 FIVB World Championships and the 2008 Beijing Olympics. Since then she has coached the 2010 7th ranked AVP team of Dianne DeNecochea/Brittany Hochevar and the 2012 3rd ranked FIVB team of Misty May/Kerri Walsh, as well as trained hundreds of other professional beach volleyball players.

References

Living people
American women's volleyball players
1964 births
Filipino emigrants to the United States
American sportspeople of Filipino descent
American women's beach volleyball players
Olympic volleyball players of the United States
UCLA Bruins women's volleyball players
Volleyball players at the 1988 Summer Olympics
Competitors at the 1986 Goodwill Games
Sportspeople from Quezon City
Sportspeople from Santa Monica, California
Pan American Games medalists in volleyball
Pan American Games bronze medalists for the United States
Medalists at the 1987 Pan American Games